Philipp Jakob Sachs (26 August 1627, Breslau- 7 January 1672, Breslau) was a German physician, naturalist, and editor of Ephemerides Academiae naturae curiosorum, the first ever learned journal in the field of medicine and natural history. He was a state physician in Breslau, and one of the founders of the Academia Naturae Curiosorum (Leopoldina).

His works include the 1665 Gammarologia, on crabs.

Works

Notes

External links
 The Correspondence of Philipp Jakob Sachs von Löwenheim in EMLO
 J. Child Orthop. 2010 Apr;4(2):105-6. doi: 10.1007/s11832-009-0235-0. Epub 2010 January 12.
 Historical note: an analysis of a 17th-century illustration of a child with split hand/split foot malformation.
 Ohry A, Frydman M. In one of Philipp Jakob Sachs von Lewenhaimb's (1627-1672) books, one may find perhaps the first illustration of a child with the split hand/split foot malformation. A short historical note and some clinical genetic data are given.
 Tagungsberichte (PDF), ahf-muenchen.de
 univie.ac.at

1627 births
1672 deaths
17th-century German physicians
17th-century German writers
17th-century German male writers